Israel competed at the 2008 Summer Olympics in Beijing, China. This was Israel's fourteenth participation in the Summer Olympics.

Israel sent 43 athletes to compete in Beijing, the largest Israeli delegation in Olympic history, with the previous record having been 40 in 2000, and was broken in 2016 with 47. The Olympic team was split  23 men and 20 women, which is the largest share of women in Israel's summer Olympic history. This was the youngest delegation in Israel's Olympic history, with about half the team under the age of 23, and many of them were expected to reach their peak in time for the 2012 Olympics in London.

Shooter Guy Starik became the second Israeli in Olympic history to participate in 4 Olympic Games. Three athletes made their third Olympic appearance: pole vaulter Aleksandr Averbukh, who has two European championship titles, two world championship medals and two Olympic finals in his resume, judoka Ariel Ze'evi, three-times European champion and bronze medalist in 2004 Summer Olympics, and canoer Michael Kolganov, former world champion and bronze medalist in 2000 Summer Olympics, who was the flagbearer for Israel in the opening ceremony.
12 other athletes made their second Olympic appearance, while 27 athletes made their Olympic debut at Beijing.

Israel made its Olympic debut in Beijing in the team event in rhythmic gymnastics, women's épée in fencing, women's one-person dinghy (Laser Radial) in sailing, and women's doubles in tennis.

Among the medal hopefuls were Ariel Ze'evi, and also Udi Gal and Gideon Kliger, 3-times world bronze medalists in sailing 470 class, Shahar Tzuberi, world bronze medalist in sailboard Neil Pryde RS:X class, and tennis men's double team Jonathan Erlich and Andy Ram, winners of the 2008 Australian Open and #3 seeds in the Olympic tournament.

Medalists

Other notable achievements

Results summary

The largest delegation in Israel's Olympic history won just one bronze medal by Shahar Tzuberi in this Olympics, which was below the expectations of the National Olympic committee. However, beside disappointment from failures of medal hopefuls, such as Arik Ze'evi, Udi Gal and Gideon Kliger, and Jonathan Erlich and Andy Ram, there were some fine performances from other athletes.

The sailing team was close to win another medal by Vered Buskila and Nike Kornecki in women's 470 class, who finished in fourth place, while Maayan Davidovich became the first Israeli female windsurfer to place in the top 10.

The Gymnasts excelled and recorded first finals in Israel Olympic history by Alex Shatilov, 8th in men's floor (best achievement in artistic gymnastics), the rhythmic team placed sixth on its debut in the team all-around event, while Irina Risenzon placed 9th in the rhythmic individual all-around event. Also the 14th place of Neta Rivkin, the youngest member of the Olympic team, was a good achievement.

There were plenty of national records in the swimming pool – 11 in 17 races – and 3 swimmers achieved 4 top-16 places between them, more than any previous Olympics. Gal Nevo was the best of them, with 11th place in 400 metres individual medley and 13th place in 200 metres individual medley. Nimrod Shapira Bar-Or got 15th place in 200 metres freestyle, and Guy Barne'a 16th in 100 metres backstroke.

Among the other sports, there was only one notable achievement, Gal Yekutiel's fifth place in judo, which was beyond the expectations from him.

In shooting, 4-times Olympian Guy Starik came close to the final of the rifle prone event, but a miss on the final shot placed him in 12th place, losing on tie break to the 4 shooters ranked above him.

On the down side, all four athletes in track-and-field failed to reach their expected results, all three fencers were eliminated in their first bouts, and four tennis players recorded just one win between them (by Shahar Pe'er) before being eliminated.

Athletics

Four athletes represented Israel in Beijing.

Men
Track & road events

Field events

Canoeing

Sprint
Michael Kolganov represented Israel in kayaking.

Qualification Legend: QS = Qualify to semi-final; QF = Qualify directly to final

Fencing 

Delila Hatuel, Noam Mills and Tomer Or represented Israel.

Men

Women

Gymnastics

Artistic
Alexander Shatilov represented Israel.

Men

Rhythmic
Irina Risenzon, Neta Rivkin and a team of 5 gymnasts represented Israel.

Judo

3 judoka represented Israel.

Men

Women

Sailing

Seven sailors in five boats represented Israel in Beijing.

Men

Women

Shooting

Three shooters represented Israel in Beijing 

Men

Swimming

Seven swimmers represented Israel in the Olympics.

Men

Women

Synchronized swimming 

Anastasia Gloushkov and Inna Yoffe represented Israel.

Taekwondo

Bat-El Gatterer competed in Taekwondo.

Tennis

Jonathan Erlich, Andy Ram, Tzipora Obziler and Shahar Pe'er competed in tennis.

See also
 Israel at the 2008 Summer Paralympics

References

External links
 Official website of the 2008 Summer Olympics

Nations at the 2008 Summer Olympics
2008
Summer Olympics 2008